Boslymon is a hamlet in Cornwall, England, United Kingdom three miles (5 km) south of Bodmin. It is in the civil parish of Lanlivery.

References

Hamlets in Cornwall